The 2002 South African motorcycle Grand Prix was the second round of the 2002 MotoGP Championship. It took place on the weekend of 19–21 April 2002 at the Phakisa Freeway.

MotoGP classification

250 cc classification

125 cc classification

Championship standings after the race (MotoGP)

Below are the standings for the top five riders and constructors after round two has concluded.

Riders' Championship standings

Constructors' Championship standings

 Note: Only the top five positions are included for both sets of standings.

References

South African motorcycle Grand Prix
South African
Motorcycle Grand Prix
April 2002 sports events in Africa